Mendon Morrill (September 18, 1902 – March 12, 1961) was a United States district judge of the United States District Court for the District of New Jersey.

Education and career
Born in Worcester, Massachusetts, Morrill graduated from Harvard College in 1923 and received a Bachelor of Laws from Harvard Law School in 1926. He was in private practice in Massachusetts and in Paterson, New Jersey. In 1942, he became a first lieutenant in the United States Army.

Federal judicial service
On March 25, 1958, Morrill was nominated by President Dwight D. Eisenhower to a seat on the United States District Court for the District of New Jersey vacated by Judge Alfred E. Modarelli. Morrill was confirmed by the United States Senate on April 22, 1958, and received his commission on April 23, 1958. Morrill served in that capacity until his death on March 12, 1961.

See also
List of Jewish American jurists

References

Sources

1902 births
1961 deaths
Harvard College alumni
Harvard Law School alumni
Judges of the United States District Court for the District of New Jersey
United States district court judges appointed by Dwight D. Eisenhower
20th-century American judges
United States Army officers